Kwangju Ilbo is a Korean regional daily newspaper. It was part of Daeju Group in November 2003. It was created by Honam journalists in 1952. Kwangu Ilbo was formed by a merger of Jeonnam Ilbo and Jeonnam Meil because of a media blackout imposed by a new army group (1980th). In 2004, it was changed from an evening to a morning newspaper. Now, Kwangju Ilbo has sent journalists outside of Korea with some similar local newspaper firms to deliver more information to their readers. Also, it uses a cutting-edge rotary press system and has developed a creative editing system. Furthermore, it has been held 'Honam area art festival', Marathon for 3.1, baseball competition and so on by means of social responsibility of firms. In 2004, Kwangju Ilbo announced second foundation and they effected large reforms for informative and entertaining production system. It does its best to act as a guide of the media.

History

1952 to 1980
The Kwangju Ilbo was founded on 31 November 1980 as The Daily local newspaper, which combined The Jeonnam Ilbo  and The Jeonnam Maeil Ilbo .
At that time, The Jeonnam Ilbo  had been in existence for twenty-eight years and nine months (with 9635 issues), The Jeonnam Maeil Ilbo had been in existence for twenty years and two months (with 5806 issues).

1980 to 1990
In 1982, they made 'Mudeung Munhwa award'. In 1984, they published <Monthly Yehyang>.

1990 to 2000
In 1990, they conducted a campaign to raise funds for the construction of Namdo Haksuk and introduced Computer Type System.
In 1993, they published 「Gwang-ju  Cheonam one hundred years chronological table」, and slated for Electric light news-board.
In 1996, they purchased Cutting edge color rotary press, starting internet service. and operating Super sized Electric light news-board. 
In 1997, Second factory was published at Songha-dong, Namgu, Gwangju.

2000 to present
In 2004, <Monthly Yehyang> was discontinued (with 209 issues).
In May 2004, they founded Hampyeong Dynasty CC.
Since January 2004, converted to morning paper, they started the second inception.
In 2011, Kwangju Ilbo channel A was set up.

Content
At first, it was published for 48 pages a week. In 1981 it was expanded from 48 to 72 pages per week (12 pages a day). In 1999, it was fully written laterally. In 2004, it became a morning paper. Now it offers national and world news daily, as well as weather, sports, entertainment, business and travel coverage.

Typeface
This newspaper has been using 'ground' typeface.

Online presence
Kwangju Ilbo has had an online presence since 1996.

Editors
Nam-jung Kim (1884-1975)
Jong-tae Kim (1975-1994)
Seoung-ho Choi (1993-1912)
Young-ho Son (2003-2004)
In-ho Baeck (2004-2006)
Jin-young Kim (2006-2009)
Jae-cheol You (2009-2012)
Yae-song Kim (2012-2013)

Prices
Kwangju Ilbo prices are: 10,000 won per month, about US$9.00 per month.

Readership
About 45,000 people have subscribed to this newspaper per day. It is ranked at 9 among local newspaper industry in South Korea except for major newspapers like Chosun or Dong-a Ilbo. The reason for its small number of subscribers is that in Jeoun-Nam province, there are fewer people than in other regions.

Ownership
It is owned by Daeju Group. Daeju Group started from Daeju Instruction. It has become a solid business entity with 14 affiliates. In particular, the company showed rapid growth in the 2000s. It aimed to diversify its business and this has paid off well. Kwangju Ilbo became affiliated with Daeju Group in 2003.

Cultural and sports works
Kwangju Ilbo is spearheading culture development. They hold events throughout cultural and sports areas. Honam Art Festival is the biggest cultural event. The festival was started in 1956. It was never stopped once since the beginning. Many artists dream of performing on the stage. For 50 years, approximately half a million people performed in this festival and it has produced hundreds of top talented artists. Now, only kids can take part in the events.

Mission statement
 We seek fairness and stay balance.
 We lead spreading cultures.
 We take the head Regional Development.

References

External links
Official website 

Publications established in 1980
Newspapers published in South Korea
Korean-language newspapers

ko:광주일보